A government crisis started on 21 June 2021 in Sweden after the Riksdag ousted Prime Minister Stefan Löfven with a no-confidence vote. This was the first time in Swedish history a Prime Minister was ousted by a no-confidence vote. After winning the 2014 Swedish general election, the Löfven II Cabinet's government budget was rejected by the Riksdag, causing a government crisis that lasted for nearly an entire month. The 2021 government crisis is the second government crisis with a Löfven cabinet. The vote was called on 17 June 2021 by the Sweden Democrats after the Swedish Left Party withdrew support for Löfven over the rent control reforms which is an important issue for many voters.

After a week where he had to decide either to resign or declare a snap election, Löfven chose to resign on 28 June, meaning that the Speaker of the Riksdag Andreas Norlén was tasked to find a Prime Minister the Riksdag could tolerate. In the meantime, Löfven remained as Prime Minister but only as part of a caretaker government. On 7 July, Löfven was re-elected by the Riksdag, as 173 MPs voted against him out of the 175 necessary for a candidate to fail such a vote. The Löfven III Cabinet was officially formed and installed on 9 July.

Background 

After the 2018 Swedish general election, the Social Democratic Party together with the Green Party joined together with Centre Party and Liberal Party to form the January Agreement (Swedish: Januariavtalet). This agreement gained passive support from the Left Party who were excluded from the agreement. The agreement stated that the Social Democratic Party and Green Party would form the government with the support from the Centre Party and Liberal Party who would have some of their political programme adopted by the government. The January Agreement consists of 73 points ranging from immigration policy to housing policy. The Left Party were heavily against two points in the agreement, a proposal to reform the Employment Protection Act, and another point which would introduce market rents (i.e. the end of rent control) for newly-built residential developments, the latter of which was the main cause to the uprising of the government crisis. Both of these points were conditions of the Centre and Liberal Parties during the negotiations, rather than Social Democratic or Green Party policy. As early as 2018, the then party leader of the Left Party, Jonas Sjöstedt said that they would not hesitate to declare a no-confidence vote against the government if they were to introduce a bill on market rents, and this threat was repeated when voting to make Löfven Prime Minister.

On 8 June 2021, the report of government's commission on removing rent controls on new-build apartments was concluded and delivered to the government. On 15 June, the Left Party leader Nooshi Dadgostar called a press conference and gave the government a 48-hour ultimatum to scrap the proposed law. On 17 June, the government had not said a word and Dadgostar announced that they no longer had confidence in the government. Jimmie Åkesson, the party leader of the Sweden Democrats gave his support to Dadgostar and shortly thereafter a vote was called by the Sweden Democrats to the Speaker of the Riksdag. Both leaders of the opposition parties Moderate Party and Christian Democrats announced that they also had no confidence in the sitting government. This meant there was a majority in the Swedish Riksdag that had no confidence in Stefan Löfven and a successful no-confidence vote was imminent.

Vote 
On 21 June, the no-confidence vote took place and Stefan Löfven was ousted by a majority of the Swedish Riksdag. Because of the COVID-19 pandemic in Sweden only 55 members of the Swedish Parliament were allowed to partake in a vote in the chamber. According to the Basic Laws of Sweden, there has to be at least 175 yes-votes from the members of the parliament for a Prime Minister to be ousted. Because of this, the "55-rule" was not applied for this vote and all 349 members of the Swedish Parliament had to be present for the vote, unless symptoms of Covid-19 were present at the time. The decision to have all 349 members present was criticized by Swedish media personalities who meant this vote could become a superspreading event of Covid-19. Some members of parliament were hesitant to the decision and called it "unpleasant" and "uncomfortable" that there was a slight risk of sick people not staying home during the vote. Prior to the vote, the Speaker of the Riksdag called in the Parliamentary leaders for every Swedish party to discuss how the vote would take place. Johan Carlson, director general for the Public Health Agency of Sweden said that the strategy that was put forward were well thought out and reasonable for the occasion.

The Swedish Riksdag previously had a recommendation in place on wearing face masks in the building, however this recommendation was abolished on 14 June and put into effect on 18 June. For the vote on 21 June, the recommendation was put into place once again temporarily.

The vote took place on 21 June at 10:00 AM (CEST), and a majority of the members of parliament voted yes to oust Löfven. This was the first time a Swedish Prime Minister lost a vote of confidence in the Swedish Riksdag. This gave Löfven a week to resign or declare a snap election.

Aftermath 
Annie Lööf, leader of Centre Party announced on 23 June 2021 that they were abandoning point 44, rent control reforms, which would introduce market rents on newly built apartments. The Liberals, who previously stated they were going to support a new liberal government, declined any further talks with the Centre Party revolving the January agreement. As it stands from 23 June, Prime Minister Stefan Löfven's only hope to stay as the Prime Minister lies in the hands of the two independent politicians in the Swedish Riksdag, Emma Carlsson Löfdahl (formerly member of the Liberals) and Amineh Kakabaveh (formerly member of the Left Party). Both need to vote for Stefan Löfven as Prime Minister in the next Riksdag vote for Löfven to retain the premiership.

During a press conference on 28 June, Löfven announced that he would resign, meaning that the Speaker of the Riksdag Andreas Norlén would start the process of finding a Prime Minister the Riksdag can tolerate. In the meantime Löfven remains PM but only as part of a caretaker government.

Government formation talks and re-election of Löfven 

Speaker Andreas Norlén started government formation talks with the party leaders on 29 June. In the afternoon, Moderate party leader Ulf Kristersson was formally tasked with forming a government and given three days. On 1 July, Kristersson informed the Speaker that there was not enough support in parliament for his proposed government constellation, one consisting of his own Moderate Party, the Christian Democrats, the Sweden Democrats and the Liberals. The same day, the Speaker gave Stefan Löfven until 5 July to find an acceptable government coalition. The Speaker can propose a prime ministerial candidate four times before a snap election is automatically called.

On 7 July, Stefan Löfven was re-elected by the Riksdag, 173 MPs voted against him out of the 175 necessary for a candidate to fail such a vote. Löfven's third government was officially formed on 9 July.

See also 
2021 Swedish government formation

References 

Government of Sweden
Political history of Sweden
2021 in Sweden
Swedish
Swedish